Lafayette "Faye" Abbott (August 16, 1895 – January 21, 1965) was an American football player for the Dayton Triangles from 1921 to 1929. He made his debut in the APFA in 1921, after going to college at the Syracuse University and Kenyon College. He played in 57 games, all with the Triangles. He also served as their head coach in 1928 and 1929, where he finished 0–7, 10th in the NFL, and 0–6, 12th in the NFL, respectively. He completed 12 out of 38 career passes for a total of 244 yards, zero touchdowns, and eight interceptions. He had five career interceptions, and three receptions for 34 yards and a touchdown, which came in 1921. He had 65 career punts for 1,996 yards, which is 30.7 average.

Head coaching record

NFL

References

1895 births
1965 deaths
American football running backs
Dayton Triangles coaches
Dayton Triangles players
Kenyon Lords football players
Syracuse Orange football players
People from Franklin County, Ohio
Players of American football from Ohio